Dinitrogen trioxide is the chemical compound with the formula N2O3.  It is one of the simple nitrogen oxides. It forms upon mixing equal parts of nitric oxide and nitrogen dioxide and  cooling the mixture below −21 °C (−6 °F):
NO + NO2  N2O3
Dinitrogen trioxide is only isolable at low temperatures, i.e. in the liquid and solid phases. In liquid and solid states, it has a deep blue color. At higher temperatures the equilibrium favors the constituent gases, with Kdiss = 193 kPa (25 °C).

This compound is sometimes called "nitrogen trioxide", but this name properly refers to another compound, the (uncharged) nitrate radical .

Structure and bonding 
Typically, N–N bonds are similar in length to that in hydrazine (145 pm). Dinitrogen trioxide, however, has an unusually long N–N bond at 186 pm. Some other nitrogen oxides also possess long N–N bonds, including dinitrogen tetroxide (175 pm). The N2O3 molecule is planar and exhibits Cs symmetry. The dimensions displayed below come from microwave spectroscopy of low-temperature, gaseous N2O3:

It is the anhydride of the unstable nitrous acid (HNO2), and produces it when mixed into water. An alternative structure might be anticipated for the true anhydride, i.e. O=N–O–N=O, but this isomer is not observed. If the nitrous acid is not then used up quickly, it decomposes into nitric oxide and nitric acid. Nitrite salts are sometimes produced by adding N2O3 to solutions of bases:
N2O3 + 2 NaOH →  2 NaNO2  +  H2O
Here the oxidation state of one nitrogen is +3.

References

External links 
National Pollutant Inventory – Oxides of nitrogen fact sheet
Webelements: Compound data – dinitrogen trioxide
Oxides of nitrogen – synthesis and uses 
Ivtantermo – dinitrogen trioxide table of values

Nitrogen oxides
Acidic oxides
Acid anhydrides
Sesquioxides